Thunder & Roses is the seventh studio album recorded by American country music artist Pam Tillis. It is also the last album she recorded for the Arista label. Its lead-off single, "Please", was a #22 hit on the Billboard Hot Country Songs charts in 2002. "It Isn't Just Raining" was later recorded in 2003 by its co-writer, Jennifer Hanson, on her self-titled debut album, and the title track was previously recorded by Mindy McCready on her 1999 album I'm Not So Tough. "Please" would go on to be Pam's last appearance on the Country Singles Chart after it peaked in spring of 2001.

Track listing

Personnel
David Angell – violin
Janet Askey – violin
Mike Brignardello – bass guitar
Lisa Cochran – background vocals
Pat Coil – piano, synthesizer
Chad Cromwell – drums
Eric Darken – percussion
David Davidson – violin
Jerry Douglas – dobro
Dan Dugmore – steel guitar
Thom Flora – background vocals
Larry Franklin – fiddle
Paul Franklin – pedabro
Vince Gill – vacuum cleaner, background vocals
Carl Gorodetzky – violin
Kenny Greenberg – electric guitar
Gerald Greer – violin
Adie Gray – background vocals
David Grissom – electric guitar
Wes Hightower – background vocals
John Hobbs – Hammond organ, piano, synthesizer
Dann Huff – electric guitar
Joanna Janet – background vocals
John Jorgenson – acoustic guitar, electric guitar
Jeff King – electric guitar
Lee Larrison – violin
Paul Leim – drum programming, drums, percussion
B. James Lowry – acoustic guitar
Liana Manis – background vocals
Brent Mason – electric guitar
Jerry McPherson – electric guitar
Greg Morrow – drums
Cate Myer – violin
Steve Nathan – keyboards, Hammond organ, piano, synthesizer, synthesizer strings
Russ Pahl – steel guitar
Michael Rhodes – bass guitar
Chris Rodriguez – background vocals
Scotty Sanders – steel guitar
Randy Scruggs – banjo
Lisa Silver – background vocals
Pam Sixfin – violin
Jeffrey Steele – background vocals
Harry Stinson – background vocals
Mel Tillis – vocals on "Waiting on the Wind"
Pam Tillis – lead vocals
Alan Umstead – violin
Catherine Umstead – violin
Mary Kathryn Van Osdale – violin
Billy Joe Walker Jr. – acoustic guitar, electric guitar
Carolyn Wann Bailey – violin
Biff Watson – acoustic guitar
Karen Winkleman – string arrangements
Glenn Worf – bass guitar
Paul Worley – acoustic guitar
Curtis Young – background vocals
Jonathan Yudkin – fiddle, mandolin

Chart performance

References

2001 albums
Arista Records albums
Pam Tillis albums